Naya Zamana (Urdu "New Era") may refer to:

Naya Zamana, List of newspapers in Pakistan
Naya Zamana (:hi:नया ज़माना (1957 फ़िल्म)) 1957 film with Musarrat Nazir, Mala Sinha
Naya Zamana (1971 film), a 1971 Hindi film produced and directed by Pramod Chakrovorty